Pan Shiyun (born April 20, 1989) is a Chinese swimmer. He competes in the S7 categorisation. At age 11, he had an electrical accident that caused him to lose the use of his right arm.

At the 2012 Summer Paralympics, Shiyun won two gold medals and two silver medals.

Shiyun won a further two gold medals at the 2016 Summer Paralympics. He took gold in the 50m freestyle event in a world record time, before also winning the 50m butterfly, breaking his own world record set the previous year.

References

Paralympic swimmers of China
Swimmers at the 2012 Summer Paralympics
Paralympic gold medalists for China
Living people
World record holders in paralympic swimming
1989 births
Paralympic silver medalists for China
Medalists at the 2012 Summer Paralympics
S7-classified Paralympic swimmers
Swimmers at the 2016 Summer Paralympics
Medalists at the 2016 Summer Paralympics
Medalists at the World Para Swimming Championships
Paralympic medalists in swimming
Chinese male freestyle swimmers
Chinese male butterfly swimmers
21st-century Chinese people